Concèze is a commune in the Corrèze department in central France. It is famous for its raspberry festival held annually in July and features in the Guinness Book of Records for the largest raspberry tart made in place within the world.

Population

Events
Concèze is well known in France for its annual Poetry Festival, in August.

See also
Communes of the Corrèze department

References

Communes of Corrèze